Martin Reynders (born 11 April 1972) is a Dutch former professional footballer who played as a forward in the Netherlands, Finland and the United States.

Career
Reynders began his career with PEC Zwolle, graduating from the club's U19 team to the first team in 1990. He remained with Zwolle until 1998 when he moved to the United States and signed with the Nashville Metros of the USISL A-League.  In November 1998, Reynders returned to Europe where he joined FC Jokerit in the Finnish Veikkausliiga.  In 1999, he moved to FC Haka, also in Finland.  In 2000, Reynders joined FC Den Bosch.  He played for SC Veendam in 2001-2002 then retired from professional football.  He later played a handful of games for PEC Zwolle while working as an assistant manager from 2006 to 2008.

Personal life
Reynders is the father of the footballers Eliano and Tijjani Reijnders.

External links
 Dutch Players Abroad: Martin Reynders

References

Living people
1972 births
Sportspeople from Zwolle
Dutch footballers
Footballers from Overijssel
Association football forwards
Eredivisie players
Eerste Divisie players
A-League (1995–2004) players
Veikkausliiga players
FC Jokerit players
FC Den Bosch players
FC Haka players
Nashville Metros players
PEC Zwolle players
SC Veendam players
Dutch expatriate footballers
Dutch expatriate sportspeople in the United States
Expatriate soccer players in the United States
Dutch expatriate sportspeople in Finland
Expatriate footballers in Finland
PEC Zwolle non-playing staff